Mitchell Bernard Pinnock (born 12 December 1994) is an English  footballer who plays for Northampton Town.

Career
Pinnock began his career with Southend United and made his professional debut on 16 April 2013 in a 2–0 victory against Aldershot Town. He had a loan spell at East Thurrock United of the Isthmian League Premier Division in 2014. Following his release from Southend, he joined Bromley. He made his debut for the club in a 1–0 home win over Bath City on 18 October, coming on as a second-half substitute. In a home fixture against Hemel Hempstead Town, Pinnock played over 45 minutes as goalkeeper, following Seb Brown's sending off. He made two further league appearances for Bromley, before joining Concord Rangers on loan in December. In February 2015, he moved to Tonbridge Angels on a month's loan. He was recalled from his loan early by Bromley, due to injuries to several attacking players. However, he returned to Tonbridge at the end of March, on loan for the remainder of the season.

During the summer of 2015 he joined Maidstone United, subsequently going out to Tonbridge Angels for a third loan spell in September. Following his release by Maidstone United in November, he was signed by Dover Athletic later that same week.

After a brief spell with Kingstonian, he re-signed for Dover Athletic in July 2016 until the end of the 2016–17 season.

In the summer of 2018, he signed with AFC Wimbledon on a permanent transfer.

Kilmarnock
In the summer of 2020, he signed a one-year deal with Kilmarnock. Pinnock scored his first goal for the club in November 2020 in a Betfred Cup victory over Dumbarton, cutely finishing over the goalkeeper on the brink of half-time.

On 4 June 2021, it was announced that Pinnock would be leaving the club after one season after he had turned down the offer of a new contract.

Northampton Town
On 8 June 2021, Pinnock was announced to have agreed to join recently relegated League Two side Northampton Town on a two-year contract, joining the club on 1 July when his contract in Scotland would expire. Pinnock was nominated for the October League Two Player of the Month Award after claiming five assists across the course of the month, ultimately missing out to Dom Telford however.

Career Statistics

References

External links

1994 births
Living people
Sportspeople from Gravesend, Kent
Footballers from Kent
Association football midfielders
English footballers
Arsenal F.C. players
Southend United F.C. players
East Thurrock United F.C. players
Bromley F.C. players
Concord Rangers F.C. players
Tonbridge Angels F.C. players
Maidstone United F.C. players
Dover Athletic F.C. players
Kingstonian F.C. players
AFC Wimbledon players
Kilmarnock F.C. players
Northampton Town F.C. players
English Football League players
Isthmian League players
National League (English football) players
Scottish Professional Football League players